Kalusivikako N'Goma, known as Kalu N'Goma (last name also spelled as Ngoma) (born 3 August 1977 in Kinshasa) is a Democratic Republic of the Congo former professional football player. He also holds French citizenship.

He has played in the English Football League Two for Darlington F.C.

References

External links
 
 

1977 births
Living people
Association football midfielders
Democratic Republic of the Congo footballers
Democratic Republic of the Congo expatriate footballers
Expatriate footballers in England
Red Star F.C. players
FC Libourne players
Darlington F.C. players
FC Aurillac Arpajon Cantal Auvergne players
Aviron Bayonnais FC players
FC Montceau Bourgogne players
21st-century Democratic Republic of the Congo people